Fengsu Tongyi, also known as Fengsu Tong, is a book written about 195 AD by Ying Shao, who lived during the later Eastern Han period. The manuscript is similar to an almanac, which describes various strange and exotic matters of interest to the literati of the period, such as cultural practices, mystical beliefs, and musical instruments.

Chapters
There were originally a total of 30 chapters but only 10 remain. These chapters were recompiled by Su Song (蘇頌) from the works of Yu Zhongrong (庾仲容) and Ma Zong (馬總). Some fragments of the lost chapters exist as quotations in other Chinese texts.
皇霸 Huangba
正失 Zhengshi
愆禮 Yanli
過譽 Guoyu
十反 Shifan
聲音 Shengyin
窮通 Qiongtong
祀典 Sidian
怪神 Guaishen
山澤 Shanze

The twenty lost chapters are: Xinzheng 心政, Guzhi 古制, Yinjiao 陰教, Bianhuo 辨惑, Xidang 析當, Shudu 恕度, Jiahao 嘉號, Zhengcheng 徽稱, Qingyu 情遇, Xingshi 姓氏, Huipian 諱篇, Shiji 釋忌, Jishi 輯事, Fuyao 服妖, Sangji 喪祭, Gongshi 宮室, Shijing 市井, Shuji 數紀, Xinqin 新秦, and Yufa 獄法.

References

External links

Fengsu Tongyi

Chinese-language books
2nd-century books
Han dynasty texts